Bluestone High School was a public high school in Skipwith, Virginia, in Mecklenburg County. It was part of the Mecklenburg County Public Schools and, according to the plaque in the school lobby, officially opened on September 12, 1955. It closed in 2022.  Athletic teams competed in the Virginia High School League's A James River District in Region B.
Rival's : Park View High School

Athletics
 Football
 Volleyball
 Golf
 Cross country
 Boys basketball
 Girls basketball
 Baseball
 Softball
 Boys soccer
 Girls soccer
 Track and field
 Wrestling

Music department
 Marching band
 Concert band
 Colorguard

Notable alumni
 Michael Tucker, Former MLB Player (Kansas City Royals, Atlanta Braves, Cincinnati Reds, Chicago Cubs, San Francisco Giants, Philadelphia Phillies, New York Mets
 Jerome Kersey, Former NBA Player

References

External links

Public high schools in Virginia
Schools in Mecklenburg County, Virginia